José Alfredo Domínguez (born August 7, 1990) is a Dominican former professional baseball pitcher. He played in Major League Baseball (MLB) for the Los Angeles Dodgers, Tampa Bay Rays, and San Diego Padres.

He was called up to the majors for the first time on June 29, 2013. He is the cousin of Álex Colomé and his fastball has been clocked at over 100 mph.

Career

Los Angeles Dodgers
Domínguez was signed by the Los Angeles Dodgers for $50,000 as a 16-year-old in 2007. He pitched for the Dodgers Dominican Summer League team from 2008 to 2010.  In September 2009, he was suspended 50 games for violating the Minor League Drug Prevention program, when he tested positive for stanozolol, a performance-enhancing drug.

In 2011, Domínguez moved to the U.S. based leagues and pitched for the Ogden Raptors and Arizona League Dodgers. In 2012, he began in Class-A with the Great Lakes Loons and was promoted to AA with the Chattanooga Lookouts.

Domínguez was suspended again, for violating the minor league drug policy in November 2012, receiving a 25-game suspension. After serving the suspension at the start of the 2013 season, he rejoined Chattanooga, where he 
had a 2.60 ERA in 14 games with 28 strikeouts. He was quickly promoted to the Triple-A Albuquerque Isotopes. In 8 games in AAA, he had 12 strikeouts in 8 innings without allowing a run.

His contract was purchased and he was called up to the Dodgers on June 29, 2013. He made his debut in relief on June 30 against the Philadelphia Phillies and retired the 3 batters he faced. He appeared in 9 games, with a 2.16 ERA before he was shut down with a quad strain. In 2014, he again spent most of the season with the Isotopes, where he was in 31 games and had a 3.24 ERA with 10 saves.  In 5 games with the Dodgers, he allowed 8 runs in 6.1 innings for an 11.37 ERA. He was not called up in September because he was dealing with an arm injury he suffered in the minor leagues.

Tampa Bay Rays
Domínguez was traded to the Tampa Bay Rays on November 20, 2014 (along with Greg Harris) for Joel Peralta and Adam Liberatore. On August 16, he was designated for assignment to make room for Drew Smyly. He elected free agency on November 6.

San Diego Padres
On December 23, 2015, Domínguez signed a minor league deal with the San Diego Padres. He refused his outright assignment and became a free agent after the season ended.

San Francisco Giants
Dominguez signed a minor league deal with the San Francisco Giants for the 2017 season. He was released on March 25, 2018.

Toros de Tijuana
On May 5, 2018, Domínguez signed with the Toros de Tijuana of the Mexican Baseball League. He was released on July 3, 2018.

Algodoneros de Unión Laguna
On April 16, 2019, Domínguez signed with the Algodoneros de Unión Laguna of the Mexican League. On April 19, during a game against the Guerreros de Oaxaca, umpires detected a foreign substance on his left arm, which appeared to be pine tar. He was ejected from the game, and later suspended for 10 games and fined an undisclosed amount for the incident. He became a free agent following the season.

Generales de Durango
On February 5, 2020, Domínguez signed with the Generales de Durango of the Mexican League. Domínguez did not play in a game in 2020 due to the cancellation of the Mexican League season because of the COVID-19 pandemic. On February 25, 2021, Domínguez was released.

References

External links

1990 births
Living people
Águilas Cibaeñas players
Albuquerque Isotopes players
Algodoneros de Unión Laguna players
Arizona League Dodgers players
Chattanooga Lookouts players
Dominican Republic expatriate baseball players in Mexico
Dominican Republic expatriate baseball players in the United States
Dominican Summer League Dodgers players
Durham Bulls players
El Paso Chihuahuas players
Great Lakes Loons players
Los Angeles Dodgers players
Major League Baseball pitchers
Major League Baseball players from the Dominican Republic
Mexican League baseball pitchers
Ogden Raptors players
San Diego Padres players
Tampa Bay Rays players
Tigres del Licey players
Toros de Tijuana players